Sherry Phyllis Appleton (née Tarpey, born October 28, 1942) is an American politician who is a member of the Democratic Party. She was a member of the Washington House of Representatives, representing the 23rd district from 2005 to 2021.

Career
She was on the Poulsbo City Council for two terms.

She was first elected to the Washington House of Representatives for the 23rd district in 2004. The committees she is on are the House Local Government, Public Safety, State Government & Tribal Relations, Community Development, Joint Committee on Veterans' and Military Affairs. She is the chair of the Community Development and Housing & Tribal Affairs House committees. She chairs the Council of State Governments' Public Safety Committee, and is a member of the Washington Council on Aging and Washington state's Commission on Judicial Conduct.

Personal life
She married Ron Appleton (1930–2006) in 1981. They had five children and she has lived in Poulsbo for at least 30 years.

References

1942 births
Living people
Democratic Party members of the Washington House of Representatives
Women state legislators in Washington (state)
21st-century American politicians
21st-century American women politicians